Up with the Lark is a 1943 British musical comedy film directed by Philip Brandon and starring Ethel Revnell, Gracie West and Anthony Holles.

A low-budget production during the Second World War, its main message is to treat the black marketeers as dangerous criminals.

Plot summary
During the Second World War, two incompetent female detectives, Ethel and Gracie (played by the British radio comedians Ethel Revnell and Gracie West), disguise themselves as Land Girls, with the aim of exposing the black market business that they believe a local hotel manager is running. Despite the two women's inept efforts, they eventually succeed.

Cast
 Ethel Revnell - Ethel
 Gracie West - Gracie
 Anthony Holles - Martel
 Anthony Hulme - Mr Britt
 Johnnie Schofield - Mr Tanner
 Lesley Osmond - Mabel
 Alan Kane - Fred Tompkins
 Ian Fleming - Reverend Swallow

Songs

The film contains several songs, largely detached from the plot. The two main songs are

Up With the Lark
Let's Go Cuckoo

References

External links

1943 films
1943 comedy films
British comedy films
British black-and-white films
1940s English-language films
1940s British films